Hollywood High School is a four-year public secondary school in the Los Angeles Unified School District, located at the intersection of North Highland Avenue and West Sunset Boulevard in the Hollywood district of Los Angeles, California.

History
In September 1903, a two-room school was opened on the second floor of an empty storeroom at the Masonic Temple on Highland Avenue, north of Hollywood Boulevard (then Prospect Avenue). Hollywood was incorporated as a municipality in November 1903. The Hollywood High Organ Opus 481 was a gift from the class of 1924. After suffering severe water damage from the Northridge earthquake in 1994, it was restored in 2002. The campus was listed on the National Register of Historic Places on January 4, 2012. The school's mascot was derived from the 1921 Rudolph Valentino film of the same name, The Sheik.

It was in the Los Angeles City High School District until 1961, when it merged into LAUSD.

In the 2015–16 football season, the boys' varsity football team played in the school's third championship game led by head coach Frank Galvan. They finished the season with a 12–2 record. Coach Galvan ended his 6 year Hollywood coaching career with 4 league titles, 6 play off appearances, 1 city championship appearance,  city semi finals, beating rivals 5 years straight (owning SUNSET), 25 plus all city players and ended as the winningest coach in Hollywood history. In the 2016–17 season, coached by Beverley Kilpatrick, the boys' varsity volleyball team played in the school's first-ever championship game. Their historic season ended with an overall record of 17–5.

The school's colors are Crimson and White, however, the colors most students wear to show their Sheik Pride is Red and White. The school's spirit squad uses the popular cheer chant "Red and White, come on (Sheiks) let's fight!" at sporting events! It is rumored that this shift from crimson to white began in the 1980s when the school was repainted with Red, in efforts to save budget funds. The students caught on and red has been embraced since then.

Filming location
Hollywood High has been the filming location for movies, television shows, and other productions, including the following:

 Made
 Nancy Drew
 Neon Maniacs
 Penn & Teller: Bullshit! (Season 5, Episode 1: "Obesity")
 Teenagers from Outer Space
 Tony Hawk's American Wasteland
 Morrissey: 25 Live
 Sex and the Teenage Mind

Skate spot
During the rise of street skating in the 90s, the school became a famous skate spot. Many skate videos were filmed there and one of the more iconic sites at the spot is the set of stairs, called the "Hollywood High 16."

Mural

In 2002, artist Eloy Torrez painted a mural of 13 famous entertainers, titled "Portrait of Hollywood", across the entire east wall of the school's auditorium. From left to right, the entertainers displayed are Dorothy Dandridge, Dolores del Río, Brandy Norwood, Selena, Lana Turner, Laurence Fishburne, Cantinflas, Carol Burnett, Cher, Ricky Nelson, Bruce Lee, Rudolph Valentino, and Judy Garland. All but five of the entertainers—Cantinflas, Lee, Selena, Del Rio, and Valentino—were students at Hollywood High School. The artist said the mural is a celebration of a diverse ethnic range of actors and entertainers.

Present-day learning academies
Known for preparing its graduates for careers in teaching and the performing arts, students have many opportunities in different fields of study. Hollywood High School offers four academies to its students, each with a different purpose.

Teaching Career Academy. Hollywood High school offers a Teaching Career Academy to students who seek to work with children as a career. Potential careers range from becoming a teacher to being a social worker. In order to give a student a little experience, the school works with other elementary schools and allows Hollywood High School students to tutor elementary school students.

Performing Arts Magnet. Performing Arts Magnet helps students develop their talents as actors, singers, and/or dancers.

New Media Technology. If students prefer to go into filmmaking, this academy offers the best opportunities. The New Media Technology academy helps students build their knowledge of technology. They are afforded hands-on experience with equipment usually found inside a film studio. This academy also provides internships to permit graduates to immediately start working in that field.

School for Advanced Studies. This academy does not focus on a specific career but helps students prepare for university life. If a student likes to be challenged, this academy offers classes that are at the same level of difficulty as a college class. This academy also aids students in their pursuit of higher-level critical analysis and scholastic achievement. The academy prepares students for their careers and helps them get into the best universities around the country.

Notable alumni

References

External links

 
   Hollywood High Alumni Lists of Lee Green (1969)
 Hollywood High School Alumni Association
 "Hollywood High School" (Archive) - Draft form for NRHP registration

Buildings and structures in Hollywood, Los Angeles
High schools in Los Angeles
Los Angeles Unified School District schools
Public high schools in California
Sunset Boulevard (Los Angeles)
Historic districts on the National Register of Historic Places in California
School buildings on the National Register of Historic Places in Los Angeles
Educational institutions established in 1903
1903 establishments in California
Skateboarding spots
Streamline Moderne architecture in California